Lorenzo Bertelli (born May 10, 1988) is an Italian businessman in the fashion industry and a rally driver. He is the son of Prada majority owners; fashion designer Miuccia Prada and her husband, the businessman Patrizio Bertelli.

Bertelli has been an executive director of Prada since May 2021, having previously held roles at the company as Head of Digital Communication, Group Marketing Director and Head of Corporate Social Responsibility.

In rally he occasionally competes as a privateer in the World Rally Championship and made his series debut during the 2011 season at the Rally d'Italia Sardegna.

Career results

WRC results

* Season still in progress.

PWRC results

WRC-2 results

WRC-Trophy results

References

External links
Profile at wrc.com
Profile at ewrc-results.com

1988 births
Living people
World Rally Championship drivers
Italian rally drivers
Toyota Gazoo Racing drivers
M-Sport drivers